Samuel Lyman (January 25, 1749 – June 5, 1802) was a United States representative from Massachusetts.

Early life
He was born in Goshen in the Connecticut Colony on January 25, 1749. He was the son of Moses Lyman, III (1713–1768) and Sarah (née Hayden) Lyman (1716–1808). His brother, Moses Lyman, IV (1744–1829) served as a colonel in the American Revolution.

He attended Goshen Academy and graduated from Yale College in 1770.  He taught school, studied law in Litchfield, Connecticut, was admitted to the bar and commenced practice in Hartford.

Life in Massachusetts
He moved to Springfield, Massachusetts in 1784, was elected a member of the Massachusetts House of Representatives, and served in the Massachusetts State Senate.  He was a justice of the court of common pleas of Hampshire County, and was elected as a Federalist to the Fourth, Fifth, and Sixth Congresses and served from March 4, 1795, until November 6, 1800, when he resigned.  He died in Springfield on June 5, 1802.  His interment was in Goshen, Connecticut.

Other Family
Samuel's sister, Anna Lyman (1746–1842), married Gideon Wheeler (1745–1822), also a veteran of the American Revolution. Their daughter, Ruth, married John Savage, Chief Justice of the New York Supreme Court. They had a daughter, Mary Ann Savage, who married Ward Hunt, United States Supreme Court Justice. Their daughter, Eliza Stringham Hunt, married Arthur Breese Johnson, a great-grandson of President John Adams and great-nephew of President John Quincy Adams.

References

1749 births
1802 deaths
Massachusetts state senators
Members of the Massachusetts House of Representatives
Yale College alumni
Federalist Party members of the United States House of Representatives from Massachusetts
People from Goshen, Connecticut